Bajo el mismo cielo (English title: Under the Same Sky), is an American telenovela created by Perla Farías for Telemundo. The telenovela is an adaptation of the  2011 American drama film A Better Life directed by Chris Weitz by the screenplay Eric Eason.

Episodes

References

Lists of American drama television series episodes